Tacet is Latin which translates literally into English as "(it) is silent" (pronounced: , , or ). It is a musical term to indicate that an instrument or voice does not sound, also known as a rest. In vocal polyphony and in orchestral scores, it usually indicates a long period of time, typically an entire movement. In more modern music such as jazz, tacet tends to mark considerably shorter breaks. Multirests, or multiple-measure rests, are rests which last multiple measures (or multiple rests, each of which lasts an entire measure).

It was common for early symphonies to leave out the brass or percussion in certain movements, especially in slow (second) movements, and this is the instruction given in the parts for the player to wait until the end of the movement.

It is also commonly used in accompaniment music to indicate that the instrument does not play on a certain run through a portion of the music, e.g. "Tacet 1st time." The phrase tacet al fine is used to indicate that the performer should remain silent for the remainder of the piece (or portion thereof), and need not, for example, count rests.

Tacet may be appropriate when a particular instrument/voice/section, "is to rest for an entire section, movement, or composition." "Partial rests, of course, in every case must be written in.

"N.C." ("no chord") is often used in guitar tablature or chord charts to indicate tacets, rests, or caesuras in the accompaniment.

Uses of tacet
The earliest known usage of the term is 1724.

A unique usage of this term is in John Cage's 1952 composition 4′33″. Tacet is indicated for all three movements, for all instruments. The piece's first performance lasted a total of 4 minutes and 33 seconds, without a note being played.

See also
Latin influence in English

References

Musical notation
Musical terminology
Latin words and phrases